Supply Reef is a submerged circular reef of volcanic origin in the Northern Mariana Islands chain, about  NW of the Maug Islands. Apparent episodes of submarine volcanism were noted on December 22–24 and 26–27 in 1989.

References 
 

Geography of the Northern Mariana Islands
Volcanoes of the Northern Mariana Islands
Submarine volcanoes
Reefs of the Pacific Ocean
Seamounts of the Pacific Ocean
Reefs of the United States
Former islands from the last glacial maximum